Pasco County Schools (also known as District School Board of Pasco County) is a school district that serves Pasco County in the U.S. state of Florida. It is headquartered in Land o' Lakes.

The district includes the entire county.

History

Schools
As of the 2017-18 school year, there were 84 schools in Pasco County Schools: 49 elementary schools, 15 middle schools, 14 high schools, 3 educational centers, 1 eSchool and 6 charter schools.

Elementary schools

Anclote Elementary School (Sailor)
Bexley Elementary School (Bulldog)
Calusa Elementary School (Hawk)
Centennial Elementary School (Cyclone)
Chasco Elementary School (Cub)
Chester W. Taylor Elementary School (Astronaut)
Connerton Elementary School (Champ)
Cotee River Elementary School (Lightning Bolt)
Cypress Elementary School (Cub)
Deer Park Elementary School (Deer)
Denham Oaks Elementary School (Dragon)
Double Branch Elementary School (Rancher) (August 20, 2007 – present)
Dr. Mary Giella Elementary School (Dolphin)
Fox Hollow Elementary School (Owl)
Gulf Highlands Elementary School (Gator) (August 8, 2006 – present)
Gulf Trace Elementary School (Sea Star) (August 20, 2007 – present)
Gulfside Elementary School (Pelicans)
James M. Marlowe Elementary School (Wolf)
Lacoochee Elementary School (Eagle)
Lake Myrtle Elementary School (Turtle)
Longleaf Elementary School (Bear)
Mittye P. Locke Elementary School (Eagle)
Moon Lake Elementary School (Manatee)
New River Elementary School (Gator) (August 20, 2007 – present)
Northwest Elementary School (Mustang)
Oakstead Elementary School (Otter) (August 8, 2006 – present)
Odessa Elementary School (Wildcat)
Pasco Elementary School (Pirate)
Pine View Elementary School (Patriot)
Quail Hollow Elementary School (Quail)
Richey Elementary School (Tigers)
Rodney B. Cox Elementary School (Wildcat)
San Antonio Elementary School (Gopher)
Sand Pine Elementary School (Crane)
Sanders Memorial Elementary School (Stallion)
Schrader Elementary School (Raider)
Seven Oaks Elementary School (Eagle)
Seven Springs Elementary School (Shark)
Shady Hills Elementary School (Lion)
Sunray Elementary School (Explorer)
Trinity Elementary School (Trailblazer)
Trinity Oaks Elementary School (Mighty Oak) (August 8, 2006 – present)
Veterans Elementary School (Super Hero)
Watergrass Elementary School (Owl)
Wesley Chapel Elementary School (Wildcat)
West Zephyrhills Elementary (Bulldog)
Wiregrass Elementary School (Bull)
Woodland Elementary School (Wrangler)

Middle schools

Bayonet Point Middle School (Patriot)
Centennial Middle School (Cyclone)
Charles S. Rushe Middle School (Raven) (August 20, 2007 – present)
Chasco Middle School (Charger)
Crews Lake Middle School (Raider)
Cypress Creek Middle School (Coyote)
Dr. John Long Middle School (Longhorn) (August 8, 2006 – present)
Gulf Middle School (Buccaneer)
Hudson Middle School (Cougar)
Pasco Middle School (Pirate)
Paul R. Smith Middle School (Eagle) (August 8, 2006 – present)
Pine View Middle School  (Panther)
Raymond B. Stewart Middle School (Bulldog)
River Ridge Middle School (Royal Knight)
Seven Springs Middle School (Jaguar)
Thomas E. Weightman Middle School (Wildcat)

High schools

Anclote High School (Shark) (August 24, 2009 – present)
Cypress Creek High School (Coyote) (August 14, 2017 – present)
Fivay High School (Falcon) (August 16, 2010 – present)
Gulf High School (Buccaneer) (September 18, 1922 – present)
Hudson High School (Cobra) (August 1973 – present)
James W. Mitchell High School (Mustang) (August 14, 2000 – present)
Land o' Lakes High School (Gator) (August 1975 – present)
Pasco High School (Pirate) (August 1889 – present)
Ridgewood High School (Ram) (August 22, 1978 – May 25, 2018)
River Ridge High School (Royal Knight) (August 1991 – present)
Sunlake High School (Seahawk) (August 20, 2007 – present)
Wendell Krinn Technical High School (Kraken) (August 13, 2018 – present)
Wesley Chapel High School (Wildcat) (August 16, 1999 – present)
Wiregrass Ranch High School (Bull) (August 8, 2006 – present)
Zephyrhills High School (Bulldog) (August 1910 – present)

Education centers
Harry Schwettman Ed. Center
James Irvin Education Center
Marchman Technical Ed. Center

Charter schools
Academy at the Farm (K-8)
Athenian Academy of Pasco (K-8)
Countryside Montessori Academy (1-6)
Dayspring Academy (K-12)
Imagine School at Land O Lakes (K-8)
Pepin Academies
Union Park Charter Academy (K-8)

School Board
The School Board members are elected on a non-partisan basis.

Superintendents

References

External links

History of Education in Pasco County, Florida
MY Pasco Parent Portal

School districts in Florida
Schools in Pasco County, Florida
1887 establishments in Florida
School districts established in 1887